Pasha Kola (also Romanized as Pāshā Kolā) is a village in Lafur Rural District, North Savadkuh County, Mazandaran Province, Iran. At the 2006 census, its population was 187, in 37 families.

References 

Populated places in Savadkuh County